Fear Itself is a role-playing game published by Pelgrane Press in 2007.

Description
Fear Itself is one of the games to use the Gumshoe System. Set in a similar world to that of The Esoterrorists, Fear Itself instead focuses on ordinary people who are drawn into confrontation with the creatures of the Outer Black. The game introduces psychic powers to the Gumshoe System.

Publication history
Robin Laws designed Fear Itself (2007) for Pelgrane Press's GUMSHOE system.

Reception

Reviews
Pyramid

References

British role-playing games
Horror role-playing games
Pelgrane Press games
Robin Laws games
Role-playing games introduced in 2007